The following is a list of current and former restaurants in the U.S. state of New Jersey:

See also
Cuisine of New Jersey

New Jersey-related lists